Archizoom may refer to:

 Archizoom Associati, design studio from Florence, Italy
 Archizoom (EPFL), architecture museum located on the EPFL campus, Switzerland